Paratypothoracini is a clade of aetosaurs within the group Typothoracinae. It is a node-based taxon that includes Rioarribasuchus (=Heliocanthus), Paratypothorax, Tecovasuchus, and all descendants of their most recent common ancestor. The clade was first named in 2007 under the spelling Paraypothoracisini, after its namesake Paratypothorax. However, this spelling was based on incorrect taxonomic nomenclature, and the clade's name was corrected to Paratypothoracinae in 2016.

All synapomorphies that diagnose Paratypothoracini can be found in their osteoderms. The paramedian osteoderms are wide and lie flat, without any apparent flexure (a trait convergent with some desmatosuchin aetosaurs) The paramedians possess knob- or spine-like dorsal eminences which are strongly offset medially and practically never contact the rear margins of their respective plates. The anterior bar of each paramedian is present but only weakly raised (except in Tecovasuchus, which has a stronger anterior bar). The lateral osteoderms have a dorsal (upper) flange which is tongue-shaped and much smaller than the lateral (lower and outer) flange. In the cervical (neck) and anterior dorsal (front of the torso) regions, the lateral osteoderms send out a long and flattened horn-like blade. Paratypothorax and a vertebra referred to Rioarribasuchus also have anterior caudal ribs (at the base of the tail) which are positioned lower on the centrum than in other aetosaurs.

References

Aetosaurs
Late Triassic first appearances